Bobs Creek is a stream in Lincoln County in the U.S. state of Missouri.

Bobs Creek has the name of Robert Bob, a pioneer citizen.

See also
List of rivers of Missouri

References

Rivers of Lincoln County, Missouri
Rivers of Missouri